Ph.D. is the 1981 debut album by the band of the same name.  It was later reissued with a different cover when "I Won't Let You Down" became a hit in several countries in early 1982. The original cover was designed by Mike Payne and was the first release of his "Electrograph" artwork.

The album was reissued 3 November 2008 by Ph.D./Voiceprint Records.

The album made it to number 33 on the British Albums Chart.

Track listing
All songs written by Jim Diamond and Tony Hymas.

Little Suzi's on the Up  2:56
War Years  3:19
Oh Maria  2:48
Oo Sha Sha  3:29
I Won't Let You Down  4:21
There's No Answer to It  3:15
Poor City  3:33
Up Down  4:07
Hollywood Signs  3:23
Radio to On  3:32

Charts

Personnel
Jim Diamond - vocals
Tony Hymas - keyboards

Additional personnel
Simon Phillips - drums on 1, 2, 3, 5, 6, 8, 9 and 10
Mark Craney - drums on 4 and 7
Phil Palmer - guitar on 7
Stan Sulzmann – tenor saxophone on 10
Jane Manning – soprano vocals on 10
Cy Langston - co-producer, engineer
Neil Hornby - assistant engineer
Jeffrey Levinson - executive producer

References

1981 debut albums
Ph.D. (band) albums